Events from the year 1802 in Germany.

Incumbents

Holy Roman Empire 
 Francis II (5 July 17926 August 1806)

Important Electors
 Bavaria- Maximilian I (16 February 17996 August 1806)
 Saxony- Frederick Augustus I (17 December 176320 December 1806)

Kingdoms 
 Kingdom of Prussia
 Monarch – Frederick William III of Prussia (16 November 17977 June 1840)

Grand Duchies 
 Grand Duke of Mecklenburg-Schwerin
 Frederick Francis I– (24 April 17851 February 1837)
 Grand Duke of Mecklenburg-Strelitz
 Charles II (2 June 17946 November 1816)
 Grand Duke of Oldenburg
 Wilhelm (6 July 17852 July 1823) Due to mental illness, Wilhelm was duke in name only, with his cousin Peter, Prince-Bishop of Lübeck, acting as regent throughout his entire reign.
 Peter I (2 July 182321 May 1829)
 Grand Duke of Saxe-Weimar
 Karl August  (1758–1809) Raised to grand duchy in 1809

Principalities 
 Schaumburg-Lippe
 George William (13 February 17871860)
 Schwarzburg-Rudolstadt
 Louis Frederick II (13 April 179328 April 1807)
 Schwarzburg-Sondershausen
 Günther Friedrich Karl I (14 October 179419 August 1835)
 Principality of Lippe
 Leopold II (5 November 18021 January 1851)
 Principality of Reuss-Greiz
 Heinrich XIII (28 June 180029 January 1817)
 Waldeck and Pyrmont
 Friedrich Karl August  (29 August 176324 September 1812)

Duchies 
 Duke of Anhalt-Dessau
 Leopold III (16 December 17519 August 1817)
 Duke of Brunswick
 Frederick William (16 October 180616 June 1815)
 Duke of Saxe-Altenburg
 Duke of Saxe-Hildburghausen (1780–1826)  - Frederick
 Duke of Saxe-Coburg-Saalfeld
 Francis (8 September 18009 December 1806)
 Duke of Saxe-Meiningen
 Bernhard II (24 December 180320 September 1866)
 Duke of Schleswig-Holstein-Sonderburg-Beck
 Frederick Charles Louis (24 February 177525 March 1816)
Duke of Württemberg - Frederick I (1797–1803)

Other
 Landgrave of Hesse-Darmstadt
 Louis I (6 April 179014 August 1806)
 Margrave of Baden- Charles Frederick (21 October 177127 April 1803)

Events 
 3 March – Ludwig van Beethoven publishes his Piano Sonata No. 14, commonly known as the "Moonlight Sonata" (Mondschein), in Vienna; the availability of the sheet music is announced by Giovanni Cappi in the newspaper Wiener Zeitung.
 Johann Wilhelm Ritter builds the first electrochemical cell.

Births 
 2 May – Heinrich Gustav Magnus, German chemist, physicist (died 1870)
 26 May – Karl Ferdinand Ranke, German educator (died 1876)
 2 June – Karl Lehrs, German classicist (died 1878)
 17 June – Hermann Goldschmidt, German painter and astronomer (died 1866)
 26 August – Ludwig Michael Schwanthaler, German sculptor (died 1848)
 29 November – Wilhelm Hauff, German poet and novelist (died 1827)
 Ernst Friedrich Zwirner, Silesian-born architect working in Germany (died 1861)

Date unknown
 Friedrich Hohe, German lithographer, painter (died 1870)

Deaths 
 5 June – Johann Christian Gottlieb Ernesti, German classicist (born 1756)
 29 June – Johann Jakob Engel, German teacher and writer (born 1741)
 25 July – Friedrich Karl Joseph von Erthal, Archbishop of Mainz (born 1719)
 10 August – Franz Aepinus, German natural philosopher (born 1724)

References 

Years of the 19th century in Germany
 
Germany
Germany